This is a list of seasons completed by the Villanova Wildcats men's college basketball team.

Seasons

 Due to NCAA violations, Villanova vacated its 4–1 record in the NCAA Tournament that year

Notes

 
Villanova
Villanova Wildcats basketball seasons